The phrase "crossing the Rubicon" is an idiom that means "passing a point of no return". Its meaning comes from allusion to the crossing of the river Rubicon by Julius Caesar in early January 49 BC. The exact date is unknown. Scholars usually place it on the night of 10 and 11 January, based on speeds at which messengers could travel at that time.

His crossing of the river precipitated Caesar's civil war, which ultimately led to Caesar's becoming dictator for life (dictator perpetuo). Caesar had been appointed to a governorship over a region that ranged from southern Gaul to Illyricum. As his term of governorship ended, the Senate ordered him to disband his army and return to Rome. As it was illegal to bring armies into Italy (the northern border of which was marked by the river Rubicon) his crossing the river under arms amounted to insurrection, treason, and a declaration of war on the state. According to some authors, he uttered the phrase alea iacta est ("the die is cast") before crossing.

History
During the late Roman Republic, the river Rubicon marked the boundary between the Roman province of Cisalpine Gaul to the northeast and Italy proper (controlled directly by Rome and its allies) to the south. On the northwestern side, the border was marked by the river Arno, a much wider and more important waterway, which flows westward from the Apennine Mountains (its source is not far from the Rubicon's source) into the Tyrrhenian Sea.

Governors of Roman provinces were appointed promagistrates with imperium (roughly, "right to command") in one or more provinces. The governors then served as generals of the Roman army within the territory they ruled. Roman law specified that only the elected magistrates (consuls and praetors) could hold imperium within Italy. Any magistrate who entered Italy at the head of his troops forfeited his imperium and was therefore no longer legally allowed to command troops.

Exercising imperium when forbidden by the law was a capital offense. Furthermore, obeying the commands of a general who did not legally possess imperium was a capital offense. If a general entered Italy in command of an army, both the general and his soldiers became outlaws and were automatically condemned to death. Generals were thus obliged to disband their armies before entering Italy.

Julius Caesar

In January 49 BC C. Julius Caesar led a single legion, Legio XIII, south over the Rubicon from Cisalpine Gaul to Italy to make his way to Rome. In doing so, he deliberately broke the law on imperium and made armed conflict inevitable. Roman historian Suetonius depicts Caesar as undecided as he approached the river and attributes the crossing to a supernatural apparition. It was reported that Caesar dined with Sallust, Hirtius, Oppius, Lucius Balbus and Sulpicus Rufus on the night after his famous crossing into Italy on 10 January.

According to Suetonius, Caesar uttered the famous phrase ālea iacta est ("the die has been cast"). The phrase "crossing the Rubicon" has survived to refer to any individual or group committing itself  to a risky or revolutionary course of action, similar to the modern phrase "passing the point of no return". Caesar's decision for swift action forced Pompey, the consuls, and a large part of the Roman Senate to flee Rome.

References
 Citations

 Sources

External links
 "Rubico" on Livius.org
 Rubicon at Reference.com
 

49 BC
Border rivers
Julius Caesar
Roman Italy